The 2022 ICC Women's T20 World Cup Qualifier was an international women's cricket tournament held in September 2022. It was the fifth edition of the Women's T20 World Cup Qualifier and served as the qualification tournament for the 2023 ICC Women's T20 World Cup tournament. The top two teams from the qualifier tournament would progress to the 2023 ICC Women's T20 World Cup in South Africa.

At the conclusion of the group stage, Bangladesh, Ireland, Thailand and Zimbabwe progressed to the semi-finals which would determine the two places at the T20 World Cup. In the first semi-final, Ireland narrowly defeated Zimbabwe by 4 runs to secure a place in the T20 World Cup. Bangladesh claimed the remaining place in the World Cup by defeating Thailand by 11 runs in the second semi-final. Bangladesh went on to defeat Ireland by seven runs in the final.

Qualification
In December 2020 the ICC confirmed the qualification process for the tournament, with 37 teams scheduled to take part across five regional groups. The two teams at the bottom of the ICC Women's T20I Rankings on 30 November 2021, of those who competed at the 2020 ICC Women's T20 World Cup in Australia, entered the Qualifier. They were joined by the five winners of each of the Regional Qualifier tournaments. The final place went to the highest ranked team from the Regional Qualifiers as of 30 November 2021, who did not win their regional group.

On 30 August 2021, Scotland became the first team to advance to the Qualifier, winning the Europe tournament. Later the same day, the International Cricket Council (ICC) confirmed that the EAP qualifier had been cancelled due to the COVID-19 pandemic. As a result, the highest-ranked EAP team as of 30 November 2021 also went through.

Squads

Gargi Bhogle was unable to recover from a finger injury and was replaced in the United States squad by Mahika Kandanala. Moksha Chaudhary was ruled out of the qualifier due to medical reasons and was replaced in the United States squad by Sai Tanmayi Eyyunni. Jahanara Alam was ruled out of the tournament due to a hand injury and was replaced in the Bangladesh squad by Fariha Trisna. Fargana Hoque also missed the tournament after contracting COVID-19 and was replaced by Shohely Akhter.

Warm-up matches

Group stage

Group A

Points table

 Advanced to play-offs
 Advanced to consolation play-offs

Fixtures

Group B

Points table

 Advanced to play-offs
 Advanced to consolation play-offs

Fixtures

Consolation play-offs

5th place semi-finals

7th place play-off

5th place play-off

Play-offs

Semi-finals

3rd place play-off

Final

Final standings

 Qualified for the 2023 ICC Women's T20 World Cup.

References

External links
 Series home at ESPNcricinfo (warm-up matches)
 Series home at ESPNcricinfo

International cricket competitions in 2022–23
Qualifier
2022 in women's cricket
September 2022 sports events in Asia